Glad Tidings is a 1953 British comedy film directed by Wolf Rilla and starring Barbara Kelly, Raymond Huntley and Ronald Howard. It was based on the play of the same title by R. F. Delderfield and made at the Nettlefold Studios in Walton-on-Thames. The film's art direction was by John Stoll. The backers Eros Films were pleased enough with the film's success to adapt another Delderfield play as Where There's a Will in 1955.

Plot
A retired RAF officer returns home to his sleepy little rural community with an attractive new American fiancée, to the initial resentment of his children.

Cast
 Barbara Kelly as Kay Stuart
 Raymond Huntley as Tom Forester
 Ronald Howard as Corporal Nicholas Brayne
 Jean Lodge as Celia Forester
 Terence Alexander as Flight Lieutenant Spud Cusack
 Diana Calderwood as Josephine Forester
 Laurence Payne as Clive Askham
 Arthur Howard as Mr. Boddington
 Brian Smith as Derek Forester
 Yvette Wyatt as Miggs Forester
 Doris Yorke as Mrs. Boddington
 Stella Richman as Anna
 Harry Green as The Golfer
 John Warren as Club Barman
 Louis Matto as Waiter
 Peter Forbes-Robertson as Reception Clerk

Production
The film was made at Nettlefold Studios, Walton-on-Thames, England, and on location. A collection of then-and-now location stills and corresponding contemporary photographs is hosted at reelstreets.com.

Critical reception
TV Guide dismissed the film as a "Plodding domestic trifle", whereas Sky Cinema approved the fact that the piece provided "Raymond Huntley and Barbara Kelly (Bernard Braden's wife) with rare leading roles in a feature film. Huntley gets a chance to break away from his stuffy bureaucrats and he's a pleasure to watch."

References

Bibliography
 Chibnall, Steve & McFarlane, Brian. The British 'B' Film. Palgrave MacMillan, 2009.

External links

Glad Tidings at BFI

1953 films
British comedy films
British black-and-white films
1953 comedy films
Films directed by Wolf Rilla
Films shot at Nettlefold Studios
British films based on plays
Films shot in England
Films set in England
Films set in London
1950s English-language films
1950s British films